Tarsal artery may refer to:

 Lateral tarsal artery
 Medial tarsal arteries